Mazatlán is the second largest city in the Mexican state of Sinaloa.

Mazatlán may also refer to:

Languages
Mazatlán Mazatec, a Mazatecan language spoken in the Mexican state of Oaxaca

Places
 Mazatlán Municipality, municipality in Sinaloa
 Mazatlán Villa de Flores, town and municipality in Oaxaca
 San Juan Mazatlán, town and municipality in Oaxaca

Sports
Mazatlán F.C., football team